Cryptolechia zeloxantha is a moth in the family Depressariidae. It was described by Edward Meyrick in 1934. It is found in China (Sichuan).

References

Moths described in 1934
Cryptolechia (moth)
Taxa named by Edward Meyrick